General elections were held in Japan on 1 March 1904. The Rikken Seiyūkai party remained the largest in the House of Representatives, winning 133 of the 379 seats.

Electoral system
The 379 members of the House of Representatives were elected in 51 multi-member constituencies based on prefectures and cities. Voting was restricted to men aged over 25 who paid at least 10 yen a year in direct taxation.

Results

Notes

References

General elections in Japan
Japan
1904 elections in Japan
March 1904 events
Election and referendum articles with incomplete results